Colonel Martin Madan (1700–1756) was groom of the bedchamber to Frederick, Prince of Wales, and MP for Wootton Basset from 1742 to 1747. Madan also served as a colonel in the Dragoon Guards.

Family

Martin Madan was married to Judith Madan (née Cowper) the English poet who called him Lysander in a poem entitled "To Lysander" composed on 3 October 1726, one year after the birth of their son.

Their sons included Rev. Martin Madan, author of Thelyphthora, a defence of polygamy, and the Right Rev. Spencer Madan, bishop successively of Bristol and Peterborough. Their elder daughter, Frances Maria Cowper, married William Cowper of Hertingfordbury, her first cousin; the younger daughter Penelope (died 22 December 1805), became the wife of General Sir Alexander Maitland (1728–1820). Madan was the grandfather of General Frederick Maitland.

Madan died at Bath 4 March 1756.

References

William Prideaux Courtney (1910), Dodsley's Collection of Poetry

1700 births
1756 deaths
Members of the Parliament of Great Britain for Wootton Bassett
British MPs 1741–1747
British Army officers
Members of the British Royal Household